Mahbub Alam may refer to:

 Mahbub Alam (cricketer), Bangladeshi cricketer
 Mahbub Alam (journalist) (1863–1933), Indian journalist and publisher
 Mahbub Alam (politician) (born 1956/7), Indian politician
 Mohamed Mahbub Alam (1975–2010), Bangladeshi sprinter